The Women's 800 metres at the 2014 Commonwealth Games, as part of the athletics programme, was held at Hampden Park between 30 July and 1 August 2014.

Results

Heats

Heat 1

Heat 2

Heat 3

Heat 4

Semifinals

Semifinal 1

Semifinal 2

Final

References

Women's 800 metres
2014
2014 in women's athletics